Elodie Di Patrizi (born 3 May 1990), known professionally as simply Elodie, is an Italian singer, actress and model. She first came to prominence as the runner-up of the fifteenth season of the show Amici di Maria De Filippi.

Since 2015 she has released three studio albums, which entered the top 10 of the Italian Albums Chart, and numerous successful singles. She collaborated with Italian artists such as Emma, Elisa, Michele Bravi, Fabri Fibra, Mahmood, The Kolors, Rkomi and Marracash. She has sold over one million copies certified by FIMI and earned a MTV Europe Music Award for Best Italian Act nomination. Elodie participated at Sanremo Music Festival three times with "Tutta colpa mia" (2017), "Andromeda" (2020) and "Due" (2023).

In 2022 Elodie made her acting debout, in the leading role on Italian film Burning Hearts, premiered at the 79th Venice International Film Festival. Throughout her career, Elodie has also become the face of numerous fashion and beauty brands, including Versace, Sephora, Puma, Lancome, Levi's, Calvin Klein, Bulgari and OVS.

Biography and career
Elodie was born on 3 May 1990 in Rome, to an Italian father and a French mother of Creole descent from Guadeloupe. After ending her modelling career, she took part in season three of X Factor Italy. She was eliminated in the early stages of the competition, and then moved to Apulia. In 2015, she took part in season fifteen of Amici di Maria De Filippi, where she placed second.

After her stint on Amici di Maria De Filippi, Elodie signed with Universal Music Italy and released the single "Un'altra vita". The song peaked within the Top 40 in Italy, and was certified gold. It was followed by her debut album, also titled Un'altra vita, which peaked at number-two in Italy. Her second studio album, Tutta colpa mia, was released on 17 February 2017. It was produced by the singer and songwriter Emma Marrone and peaked at number six on Fimi's Chart, making her second consecutive top 10 album. She also competed in the Sanremo Music Festival 2017 with the song "Tutta colpa mia", which peaked at number 12 on the Italian Singles Chart and was certified platinum.

In May 2018 Elodie collaborated with Michele Bravi and Gué Pequeno on the song "Nero Bali". The song becomes the singer's first top ten in the Italian Charts, reaching number 10. Subsequently, the collaboration received a double platinum certification.

On 15 March 2019 the duet "Pensare Male" was released with the band The Kolors, also launched by the TV program Amici. In two weeks it reached the top 10 of the Italian Airplay Chart and for three consecutive weeks it was the most played song on the radio, the first for both singers. The song was cerfied platinum by Fimi. In June 2019 the collaboration "Margarita" with Italian rapper Marracash was published. The song became one of the most successful songs of the 2019 summer in Italy, receiving two platinum certifications and debuting at the number six on the Italian Singles Chart and number one on the Italian Airplay Chart.

In January 2020 was announced that Elodie would be in Sanremo Music Festival 2020's cast with the song "Andromeda", which debuted at number 35 after only two days on streaming music services. On 7 January 2020, the singer announced her third studio album This Is Elodie, which was released only by streaming music services on 31 January 2020 and in CD format on 7 February 2020 by Island Records. The new music project widespread different music genres, from R&B, pop, funk to rap and reggae, and over fifty songwriters and producers, including Michele Bravi, Takagi & Ketra, Levante, Carl Brave, Mahmood, Neffa, and Daddy's Groove. With only streams, the album debuted at number seven on Fimi's chart and was anticipated by two songs "Non è la fine" with Gemitaiz and "Mal di testa" with Fabri Fibra. The week after the closing of the Sanremo Festival, both the album and the competing song "Andromeda" reached the sixth position of the relative FIMI's charts.

On 13 May 2020, Elodie released "Guaranà" as the fourth single from her album, which was lately certified double platinum by Fimi for selling over 140,000 copies . On 19 July 2020, the singer was the lead artist of Takagi & Ketra's collaboration "Ciclone", with Gipsy Kings and Mariah Angeliq, which became her fourth Top10 song on FIMI's chart. In October 2020, Elodie featured on Carl Brave's single "Parli Parli".

On 30 December 2020, it is announced that Elodie will co-host the second evening of the 2021 Sanremo Music Festival alongside Amadeus and Fiorello. In January 2021, Amazon Prime Video announced the singer's participation in the second season of the reality show Celebrity Hunted Italia, which she ended up winning coupled with rapper Myss Keta. In September 2021, Elodie published "Vertigine", a ballad anticipating the fourth record project due in 2022. On 3 December 2021, Elodie collaborated with Italian rapper Rkomi on "La coda del diavolo", which reached the first position of the Italian Singles Chart and received 2 platinum certifications from FIMI for 200,000 copies sold.

On 3 March 2022 Elodie published her second lead single "Bagno a mezzanotte" which reached number four on the Italian Singles Chart. All proceeds from the single are given to Save the Children to help refugees from the war in Ukraine in 2022. On 10 June 2022, the third singles "Tribale" was released. In August 2022, was announced that Elodie would made her lead acting debout on Italian film Burning Hearts, directed by  Pippo Mezzapesa. The film premiered in the Orizzonti section of the 79th Venice International Film Festival on September 3, 2022. Elodie also performed the original song of the film "Proiettili (Ti mangio il cuore)" with Joan Thiele. 

On 4 December 2022, it was officially announced Elodie participation in the Sanremo Music Festival 2023. "Due" was later announced as her entry for the Sanremo Music Festival 2023. On December 9, 2022, the single "Ok. Respira" was released as the main track of the eponymous album, which is scheduled for release in 2023.

Personal life 
Prior to joining Amici di Maria De Filippi, Elodie was engaged to dj-producer Andrea Maggino. During her participation on the show Amici she met the singer Lele. The two began a relationship in June 2016, which ended two years later.

In the summer of 2019, after the release of the hit "Margarita", she started a relationship with the Italian rapper Marracash. The couple split up in the winter of 2021.

Modelling career

 Advisor for Urban Decay Cosmetics (2017)
Model for Italian clothes brand Pinko (2018-2019)
Model for Italian clothes brand Niclao (2019)
Advisor for Moët & Chandon (2019)
 Advisor of Christmas' campaign of Brosway jewels (2019)
 Model and creative designer for Italian line by Puma (2019–present)
 Model for underwater Italian brand Yamamay (2019–2021)
 New face for Italian campaign  fragrance by Calvin Klein(2019)
Advisor for Schwarzkopf Heads (2020)
Advisor for Lancome Cosmetics (2020)
Face of the charity Christmas campaign by OVS for Save the Children (2020)
Advisor and creator of a capsule collection for Sephora (2021)
Advisor and television testimonial for Oppo (2021–present)
Advisor and model for H&M (2021)
Advisor and model for Versace (2021)
Advisor and model for Bulgari (2021–present)
Advisor and model for Levi's (2022)
Advisor for YSL Beauty (2022)
Advisor for JImmy Choo x Mugler (2022)
Advisor and television testimonial for Wella Professionals (2022)

Music style and influences 
In an interview on Fanpage.it Elodie affirms "I'm a girl born in a low-income housing project, that's why rap, naked and raw, is a good representation of where I grew up, and I like that." and cites young Italian rappers beba, Chadia and Madame as examples of "women of my generation who are not afraid to show this side. We are fierce." In an interview with Rolling Stone Italy, Elodie speaks about her influences: Etta James, Raf, Kaytranada, Nina Simone, Beyoncé and Italian singers Giorgia, Mina and Lucio Battisti. She also cities Amici's coaches Emma Marrone and Elisa.

Her music is inspired by pop, R&B, rap, reggae, and urban music.

Philanthropy 
Elodie is an activist and supporter for the LGBT rights in Italy, often siding against the right-wing political party Lega Nord, regarding the campaign to pass the Italian anti-homophobia law.

Following the speech given by Giorgia Meloni, leader of the right-wing political party Fratelli d'Italia, at the 2022 convention of the Spanish far-right party Vox, Elodie said when interviewed by Peter Gomez Homen: "It's not up to you, you're not God, you don't even come close. This is what disturbs me most about fascism. We can have different ideas, see life in a different way, but there is no need for all that animosity, that nastiness. [...] It is easier to point and lash out at others for frustrations that do not concern the lives of others, but our way of life. It is much easier to lash out at black people, at gays." After the 2022 Italian government crisis, Elodie took to her social media profiles to express her disappointment with the political programme of the right-wing party Fratelli d'Italia.

The singer often points out that she was discriminated for her skin color and social status as a child, being a victim of racism.

Elodie has also spoken out for women's rights, calling herself a feminist, recriminating sexism and judgmental behavior toward women's social mores.

Discography

Albums

Singles

As lead artist

As featured artist

Accolades

Filmography

Films

Television

Music videos

References

External links 
 Profile on Amici

1990 births
Italian pop singers
Living people
Singers from Rome
21st-century Italian singers
X Factor (Italian TV series) contestants
Italian female models
Italian people of French descent
Italian people of Guadeloupean descent
Universal Music Group artists
People from Apulia
21st-century Italian women singers
Models from Rome